Myrcia chionantha (synonym Mitranthes nivea) is a species of plant in the family Myrtaceae. It is endemic to Jamaica.

References

chionantha
Endangered plants
Endemic flora of Jamaica
Taxonomy articles created by Polbot